Paramount Tower Hotel & Residences Dubai is a single 69-story mixed hotel and residential skyscraper located in Downtown Dubai, United Arab Emirates. Construction began in 2016 and the contract was given to the China State Construction Engineering by DAMAC Properties.

Building

Hotel 
Floors 15 to 25 of the building are high-end hotels rooms inspired by Hollywood studios.

Residential 
Floors 26 to 63 of the building are home to high-end residential units which feature "Paramount-standard" amenities and services.

See also
 DAMAC Towers by Paramount Hotels & Resorts

References

External links
 Paramount Tower Hotel & Residences Dubai

Residential skyscrapers in Dubai
Postmodern architecture
Hotel buildings completed in 2021
Residential buildings completed in 2021